Reggie Carthon (born July 26, 1971 in Dallas, Texas), defensive back in the Canadian Football League for the Winnipeg Blue Bombers. He attended Montana State.

References

External links 
 Winnipeg Blue Bombers

1971 births
Living people
Montana State Bobcats football players
Canadian football defensive backs
American players of Canadian football
Winnipeg Blue Bombers players
African-American players of Canadian football
21st-century African-American sportspeople
20th-century African-American sportspeople